Otter Cove is a small secluded cove on the south coast of Devon, England, between the coastal towns of Exmouth and Budleigh Salterton.  It is part of the Jurassic Coast World Heritage Site.  Due to a landslip the cove is no longer accessible from the headland.

The top of the headland, Straight Point, is used as a firing range by the Marines.

Geology 
Predominantly the cliffs in this area are composed of mudstone sediments from the Aylesbeare Mudstone Group and additionally of layers of red sandstone. These rock formations are from the Triassic period and date from about 245 million years ago. Both sediments are markedly red, which indicates that they were formed in a desert.

The cliffs to the east side of Straight Point show an interesting sequence of Exmouth Formation sandstones. However, only a small part of the coast line is accessible and solely at low tide by walking along the wave-cut ledges from Littleham Cove. These ledges are full of pot-holes and there is a cave near Otter Cove.

In the corner of Littleham Cove there is a fault and a drastic change in the character of the cliffs. Otter Cove is south of this fault and here are fluvial sandstones with beds of coarser dark subangular grains (i.e. beginning to resemble a fine-grained fluvial breccia).

References 

Jurassic Coast
Geology of Devon
Coves of Devon